Sámuel Major (born 9 January 2002) is a Hungarian professional footballer who plays as a midfielder for Pécs on loan from Debrecen, and the Hungary U21 national team.

Club career
On 5 January 2022, Major signed a long-term contract with Admira Wacker.

On 14 February 2023, Major joined Pécs on loan.

International career
He was part of the Hungarian U-17 team at the 2019 UEFA European Under-17 Championship and 2019 FIFA U-17 World Cup,

Honours
FC Liefering

Runner-up
 Austrian Football First League: 2021

References

External links 

2002 births
Living people
Sportspeople from Debrecen
Hungarian footballers
Hungary youth international footballers
Hungary under-21 international footballers
Association football forwards
FC Red Bull Salzburg players
FC Admira Wacker Mödling players
Debreceni VSC players
Pécsi MFC players
2. Liga (Austria) players
Austrian Football Bundesliga players
Nemzeti Bajnokság I players
Nemzeti Bajnokság II players
Hungarian expatriate footballers
Expatriate footballers in Austria
Hungarian expatriate sportspeople in Austria